The Sri Lanka Army Ordnance Corps International Cricket Stadium is a cricket ground in Horana, Sri Lanka, which was opened in November 2018. In February 2019, it hosted matches in the 2018–19 SLC Twenty20 Tournament.

References

Cricket grounds in Sri Lanka
Sport in Sri Lanka
Multi-purpose stadiums in Sri Lanka